In vector calculus, a conservative vector field is a vector field that is the gradient of some function. A conservative vector field has the property that its line integral is path independent; the choice of any path between two points does not change the value of the line integral. Path independence of the line integral is equivalent to the vector field under the line integral being conservative. A conservative vector field is also irrotational; in three dimensions, this means that it has vanishing curl. An irrotational vector field is necessarily conservative provided that the domain is simply connected.

Conservative vector fields appear naturally in mechanics: They are vector fields representing forces of physical systems in which energy is conserved. For a conservative system, the work done in moving along a path in a configuration space depends on only the endpoints of the path, so it is possible to define potential energy that is independent of the actual path taken.

Informal treatment

In a two- and three-dimensional space, there is an ambiguity in taking an integral between two points as there are infinitely many paths between the two points—apart from the straight line formed between the two points, one could choose a curved path of greater length as shown in the figure. Therefore, in general, the value of the integral depends on the path taken. However, in the special case of a conservative vector field, the value of the integral is independent of the path taken, which can be thought of as a large-scale cancellation of all elements  that don't have a component along the straight line between the two points. To visualize this, imagine two people climbing a cliff; one decides to scale the cliff by going vertically up it, and the second decides to walk along a winding path that is longer in length than the height of the cliff, but at only a small angle to the horizontal. Although the two hikers have taken different routes to get up to the top of the cliff, at the top, they will have both gained the same amount of gravitational potential energy. This is because a gravitational field is conservative.

Intuitive explanation

M. C. Escher's lithograph print Ascending and Descending illustrates a non-conservative vector field, impossibly made to appear to be the gradient of the varying height above ground as one moves along the staircase. It is rotational in that one can keep getting higher or keep getting lower while going around in circles. It is non-conservative in that one can return to one's starting point while ascending more than one descends or vice versa. On a real staircase, the height above the ground is a scalar potential field: If one returns to the same place, one goes upward exactly as much as one goes downward. Its gradient would be a conservative vector field and is irrotational. The situation depicted in the print is impossible.

Definition

Since  is continuously differentiable,  is continuous.

The fundamental theorem of vector calculus states that any vector field can be expressed as the sum of a conservative vector field and a solenoidal field.

Path independence and conservative vector field

Path independence 
A line integral of a vector field  is said to be path-independent if it depends on only two integral path endpoints regardless of which path between them is chosen: 

The path independence is also equivalently expressed as

for any piecewise smooth closed path  in  where the two endpoints are coincident.

Conservative vector field 
A key property of a conservative vector field  is that its integral along a path depends on only the endpoints of that path, not the particular route taken. In other words, if it is a conservative vector field, then its line integral is path-independent. Then the gradient theorem (also called fundamental theorem of calculus for line integrals) states that

This holds as a consequence of the definition of a line integral, the chain rule, and the second fundamental theorem of calculus.  in the line integral is an exact differential for an orthogonal coordinate system (e.g., Cartesian, cylindrical, or spherical coordinates). Since the gradient theorem is applicable for a differentiable path, the path independence of a conservative vector field over piecewise-differential curves is also proved by the proof per differentiable curve component.

So far it has been proven that a conservative vector field  is line integral path-independent. Conversely, if a continuous vector field  is (line integral) path-independent, then it is a conservative vector field, so the following biconditional statement holds:

The proof of this converse statement is the following.

 is a continuous vector field which line integral is path-independent. Then, let's make a function  defined as

over an arbitrary path between a chosen starting point  and an arbitrary point . Since it is path-independent, it depends on only  and  regardless of which path between these points is chosen.

Let's choose the path shown in the left of the right figure where a 2-dimensional Cartesian coordinate system is used. The second segment of this path is parallel to the  axis so there is no change along the  axis. The line integral along this path is

where the last equality is from the second fundamental theorem of calculus.

A similar approach for the line integral path shown in the right of the right figure results in  so

is proved for the 2-dimensional Cartesian coordinate system. This proof method can be straightforwardly expanded to a higher dimensional orthogonal coordinate system (e.g., a 3-dimensional spherical coordinate system) so the converse statement is proved. Another proof is found here as the converse of the gradient theorem.

Irrotational vector fields

For this reason, such vector fields are sometimes referred to as curl-free vector fields or curl-less vector fields. They are also referred to as longitudinal vector fields.

This result can be easily proved by expressing  in a Cartesian coordinate system with Schwarz's theorem (also called Clairaut's theorem on equality of mixed partials).

The above statement is not true in general if  is not simply connected. Let  be  with removing all coordinates on the -axis (so not a simply connected space), i.e., .

Therefore,  does not have the path-independence property discussed above so is not conservative even if  since  where  is defined is not a simply connected open space. 

Say again, in a simply connected open region, an irrotational vector field  has the path-independence property (so  as conservative). This can be proved directly by using Stokes' theorem,for any smooth oriented surface  which boundary is a simple closed path . So, it is concluded that In a simply connected open region, any  vector field that has the path-independence property (so it is a conservative vector field.) must also be irrotational and vise versa.

Abstraction 
More abstractly, in the presence of a Riemannian metric, vector fields correspond to differential . The irrotational vector fields correspond to the closed , that is, to the   such that . As  any exact form is closed, so any conservative vector field is irrotational. Conversely, all closed  are exact if  is simply connected.

Vorticity 

The vorticity  of a vector field can be defined by:

The vorticity of an irrotational field is zero everywhere. Kelvin's circulation theorem states that a fluid that is irrotational in an inviscid flow will remain irrotational. This result can be derived from the vorticity transport equation, obtained by taking the curl of the Navier-Stokes Equations.

For a two-dimensional field, the vorticity acts as a measure of the local rotation of fluid elements. Note that the vorticity does not imply anything about the global behavior of a fluid. It is possible for a fluid to travel in a straight line to have vorticity, and it is possible for a fluid that moves in a circle to be irrotational.

Conservative forces

If the vector field associated to a force  is conservative, then the force is said to be a conservative force.

The most prominent examples of conservative forces are a gravitational force and an electric force associated to an electrostatic field.

The force of gravity is conservative because , where

is the gravitational potential energy. In other words, the gravitation field  associated with the gravitational force  is the gradient of the gravitation potential  associated with the gravitational potential energy . It can be shown that any vector field of the form  is conservative, provided that  is integrable.

For conservative forces, path independence can be interpreted to mean that the work done in going from a point  to a point  is independent of the moving path chosen (dependent on only the points  and ), and that the work  done in going around a simple closed loop  is :

The total energy of a particle moving under the influence of conservative forces is conserved, in the sense that a loss of potential energy is converted to the equal quantity of kinetic energy, or vice versa.

See also
 Beltrami vector field
 Conservative force
 Conservative system
 Complex lamellar vector field
 Helmholtz decomposition
 Laplacian vector field
 Longitudinal and transverse vector fields
 Solenoidal vector field

References

Further reading
 

Vector calculus
Force